Dichloramine-T or N,N-Dichloro-p-toluenesulfonamide is a chemical used as a disinfectant starting at the beginning of the 20th century. The chemical contains toluene substituted by a sulfonamide grouping, which in turn has two chlorine atoms attached to the nitrogen.

Production
Dichloramine-T was first made by Frederick Daniel Chattaway in 1905.
Dichloramine-T can be made from para-toluenesulfonamide and bleaching powder, or chlorine.

Properties
Dichloramine-T degrades with exposure to light or air.

References

Sulfonamides
Organochlorides
P-Tosyl compounds